François-Xavier Demaison (born 22 September 1973) is a French actor and humorist.

Personal life 
Demaison was born in Asnières-sur-Seine. Both his parents were lawyers. He studied theater but dropped out to focus on an economics degree. After graduating in 1998 from the Sciences Po in Paris, he began his career as an auditor before joining Landwell & Associés (law firm of PricewaterhouseCoopers PWC) in the field of International taxation.

In August 2001 he was sent on an internship to their New York office. On 11 September 2001, Demaison witnessed the attack on the World Trade Center from his office in Manhattan. After this traumatic event, he decided not to continue on this career path and returned to his first love, the theater. He resumed contact with former teachers who helped him stage his own show, Act Two (he invested his saving of 5000 euros). It opened at the Théâtre du Gymnase Marie Bell in Paris on 2 December 2002.

Theater

Filmography

References

External links 
 

1973 births
Living people
French male film actors
French male stage actors
People from Asnières-sur-Seine